Homer Eugene Le Grand Jr. (September 3, 1944, Charlotte, North Carolina – January 16, 2017, Melbourne, Australia) was an American-Australian historian of science. The Geological Society of London awarded him the 1995 Sue Tyler Friedman Medal.

Biography
He grew up with his brother and two sisters in Shelby, North Carolina, where their father was a community leader. After graduating from Shelby High School, Homer E. Le Grand Jr. matriculated at the University of North Carolina at Chapel Hill. With a joint major in chemistry and history, he graduated there in 1966 with a B.A. In June 1966 in Cleveland County, North Carolina, he married Brenda Ann Lefler (born 1943). At the University of Wisconsin he graduated in 1970 with a Ph.D. in the history of science. His Ph.D. thesis is entitled Berthollet and the Oxygen Theory of Acidity. He became a member of the history department of Virginia Tech and for the academic year 1975–1976 went on sabbatical with his wife and their three small children to the University of Melbourne. From 1976 to 1999 he was a faculty member in the history department of the University of Melbourne and was there also the Dean of Arts for several years. From 1999 to 2006 at Monash University, he was a professor in the history department and also Dean of the Faculty of Arts. In 2007 he retired as professor emeritus.

In his research on the history of chemistry, Le Grand argued that Humphry Davy's discoveries enabled 19th-century chemists to fully realize the value of Lavoisier's operational definition of chemical elements as those irreducible elements which validate conservation of mass before and after a chemical transformation. The 2003 book Plate Tectonics: An Insider's History of the Modern Theory of the Earth, edited by Naomi Oreskes with the assistance of Le Grand, contains chapters by some of the most important scientists who developed plate tectonics.

In his honour, Monash University sponsors the Homer Le Grand Student Assistance Scholarship.

Upon his death he was survived by his widow, a daughter, two sons, and eight grandchildren. One son, Alexander Benton, became an orthopedic surgeon in Bozeman, Montana, and the other son, nicknamed "Chip", became a journalist employed by The Australian and The Age.

Selected publications

Articles

Books
 
  (pbk reprint of 1990 1st edition)
  (pbk reprint of 2003 1st edition)

References

1944 births
2017 deaths
American historians of science
American emigrants to Australia
Historians of science
Historians of chemistry
University of North Carolina at Chapel Hill alumni
Academic staff of the University of Melbourne
Academic staff of Monash University
People from Shelby, North Carolina